Category 4 the second-highest classification on the Australian tropical cyclone intensity scale which is used to classify tropical cyclones, that have 10-minute sustained winds of at least wind speeds of .  47 tropical cyclones have peaked Category 4 severe tropical cyclones in the South Pacific tropical cyclone basin, which is denoted as the part of the Pacific Ocean to the south of the equator and to the east of 160°E. The earliest tropical cyclone to be classified as a Category 4 severe tropical cyclone was Gyan which was classified as a Category 4 during December 22, 1981, as it impacted New Caledonia. The latest was Pola as it passed between Fiji and Tonga. This list does include any tropical cyclones that peaked as a Category 5 severe tropical cyclone, while in the Southern Pacific tropical cyclone basin.

Background
The South Pacific tropical cyclone basin is located to the south of the Equator between 160°E and 120°W. The basin is officially monitored by the Fiji Meteorological Service and the New Zealand MetService, while other meteorological services such as the Australian Bureau of Meteorology, Météo-France as well as the United States Joint Typhoon Warning Center also monitor the basin. This scale is only officially used in American Samoa, however, various agencies including NASA also use it to compare tropical cyclones. A Category 4 tropical cyclone is expected to cause catastrophic devastation, if it significantly impacts land at or near its peak intensity.

Systems

|-
| Pam ||  ||  ||  || Wallis and Futuna, VanuatuNew Caledonia, Queensland || Significant || Unknown ||
|-
| Gyan ||  ||  ||  || Vanuatu || || ||
|-
| Abigail ||  ||  ||  ||  || || ||
|-
| Isaac ||  ||  ||  || Tonga ||  || 6 ||
|-
| Bernie ||  ||  ||  || || || ||
|-
| NishaOrama ||   ||  ||  || French Polynesia ||  ||  ||
|-
| Oscar ||  ||  ||  || Fiji ||  || 9 ||
|-
| Rewa ||  ||  ||  || French Polynesia || || 5 ||
|-
| Sarah ||  ||  ||  || Fiji || || None ||
|-
| Tomasi ||  ||  ||  || Cook Islands, Niue || Minor || None ||
|-
| Veena ||  ||  ||  || French Polynesia || || 1 ||
|-
| Odette ||  ||  ||  || Vanuatu ||  ||  ||
|-
| Ima ||  ||  ||  || Cook Islands || || ||
|-
| Uma ||  ||  ||  || Vanuatu ||  || 50 ||
|-
| Anne ||  ||  ||  || Vanuatu, New Caledonia ||  || 2 ||
|-
| Bola ||  ||  ||  || Vanuatu, Fiji, New Zealand ||  || 3 ||
|-
| Harry ||  ||  ||  || New Caledonia || || ||
|-
| Ofa ||  ||  ||  || Polynesia ||  || 8 ||
|-
| Val ||  ||  ||  || Tuvalu, Samoan Islands ||  || 16 ||c
|-
| WasaArthur ||  ||  ||  || French Polynesia ||  || 2 ||
|-
| Betsy ||  ||  ||  || Vanuatu ||  || 2 ||
|-
| Esau ||  ||  ||  || Vanuatu ||  Minimal ||  ||
|-
| Joni ||  ||  ||  || Tuvalu, Fiji ||  ||  ||
|-
| Nina ||  ||  ||  || Queensland, Tonga, Papua New GuineaSolomon Islands, Wallis and Futuna ||  ||  ||
|-
| Prema ||  ||  ||  || Vanuatu, New Caledonia ||  || 1 ||
|-
| Sarah ||  ||  ||  || || ||
|-
| Theodore ||  ||  ||  || || || ||
|-
| Beti ||  ||  ||  || New Caledonia, VanuatuAustralia, New Zealand ||  || 2 ||
|-
| Drena ||  ||  ||  || Vanuatu, New CaledoniaNew Zealand || || ||
|-
| Gavin ||  ||  ||  || Tuvalu, FijiWallis and Futuna ||  ||  ||
|-
| Dani ||  ||  ||  || Vanuatu, FijiNew Caledonia ||  || 14 ||
|-
| Kim ||  ||  ||  || French Polynesia || Minimal ||  ||
|-
| Paula ||  ||  ||  || Vanuatu, Fiji, Tonga ||  ||  ||
|-
| Waka ||  ||  ||  || Wallis and Futuna, Tonga ||  ||  ||
|-
| Eseta ||  ||  ||  || Fiji ||  || None ||
|-
| Ivy ||  ||  ||  || Vanuatu ||  ||  ||
|-
| Nancy ||  ||  ||  || Cook Islands || Severe ||  ||
|-
| Xavier ||  ||  ||  || Solomon Islands, Vanuatu || Extensive || None ||
|-
| Daman ||  ||  ||  || Fiji, Tonga ||  ||  ||
|-
| Funa ||  ||  ||  || Vanuatu || Severe ||  None ||
|-
| Oli ||  ||  ||  || Cook Islands, French Polynesia ||  ||  ||
|-
| Tomas ||  ||  ||  || Wallis and Futuna, Fiji ||  ||  ||
|-
| Zelia ||  ||  ||  || New Caledonia, Norfolk IslandNew Zealand || None || None ||
|-
| Wilma ||  ||  ||  || Samoan Islands, TongaNew Zealand ||  ||  ||
|-
| Atu ||  ||  ||  || New Caledonia, Vanuatu || ||  ||
|-
| Jasmine ||  ||  ||  || Solomon Islands, VanuatuNew Caledonia, Tonga || None || None ||
|-
| Evan ||  ||  ||  || Samoan Islands, FijiWallis and Futuna ||  ||  ||
|-
| Freda ||  ||  ||   || Solomon IslandsNew Caledonia ||  ||  ||
|-
| Sandra ||  ||  ||  || New Caledonia, New Zealand || None || None ||
|-
| Ula ||  ||  ||  || Tuvalu, Samoan Islands, TongaFiji, Vanuatu, New Caledonia || Unknown ||  ||
|-
| Hola ||  ||  ||  || Fiji, VanuatuNew Caledonia, New Zealand ||  ||  ||
|-
| Pola ||  ||  ||  || Wallis and Futuna, Fiji, Tonga ||  ||  ||
|-
| Dovi ||  ||  ||  || Vanuatu, New Caledonia, New Zealand ||  ||  ||
|-
| Judy ||  ||  ||  || Vanuatu ||  ||  ||
|}

Other systems
In addition to the 47 tropical cyclones listed above Severe Tropical Cyclone's: Kerry, Katrina and Larry, were considered by the BoM to be Category 4 Severe tropical cyclones within the South Pacific Ocean, after they had moved into the Australian region. The BoM also considered Severe Tropical Cyclone Watorea, to have been a Category 5 severe tropical cyclone, within the Australian region before it moved into the basin during February 24. This made it equivalent to a Category 5 tropical cyclone on the SSHWS, however, the FMS estimated that the system had peaked with 10-minute sustained winds of  based on the Dvorak technique, which made it a Category 4 severe tropical cyclone on the Australian scale. During 2017, a study into Category 4 and 5 tropical cyclones over the South Pacific during the 1980s, was published within the Royal Meteorological Society's International Journal of Climatology. This showed that the intensity of such tropical cyclones had been underestimated by the various warning centres during the decade.

Notes

See also
List of Category 4 Atlantic hurricanes
List of Category 4 Pacific hurricanes

References

External links

South Pacific